Bedellia psamminella, the convolvulus skeletoniser, is a moth in the family Bedelliidae. It is found in New Zealand.

Taxonomy
This species was described by Edward Meyrick in 1889.

Host species
Muehlenbeckia australis is a host to the larva of this species of moth.

References

Bedelliidae
Moths of New Zealand
Moths described in 1889
Taxa named by Edward Meyrick